Aydius is a commune in the Pyrénées-Atlantiques department in the Nouvelle-Aquitaine region of south-western France.

Geography
Aydius is located some 25 km south by south-east of Oloron-Sainte-Marie just east of Bedous. Access to the commune is by the D237 road from Bedous which goes to the village and terminates there. The commune is alpine in nature with extensive forests, rugged terrain and snow-capped mountains in the east.

The Gabarret river rises in the east of the commune and flows west gathering a large number of tributaries including the Ruisseau d'Arces, the Ruisseau du Saslars, the Gave de Béranfueil, the Gave de Bouren, the Ruisseau d'Ilhiec, the Ruisseau Sarité, the Ruisseau de Traillère, and the Ruisseau de Sahun (which forms part of the western border of the commune) before flowing west to join the Gave d'Aspe at Bedous.

Places and hamlets

 Anire
 L'Ardoisière
 Arès (barn)
 Arques (forest)
 Las Arretortes (Cap de)
 Les Arrouyes
 Baich (Rangole de)
 Barca
 Barrada
 Bat (barn)
 Bat (bridge)
 Bérangueil
 Bérie (bank)
 Bérouste (Serrot de)
 Bésur (cabin)
 Bouren
 Cachiquet (cabin)
 Calhabets (Pas de)
 Capdarest
 Capdevielle
 Capouret
 Carn de Haut (bank)
 Casaubon
 Les Catiasses (forest)
 Chechit
 Core de Cam
 Cot de Picars (alley)
 La Courade (Col de)
 Courdé
 Courrège Longue
 Cret Arrouy (Cap de)
 Escarrebirats (Pas d')
 Escourau (bank)
 Escut (forest)
 Guérègne
 Haut (Rangole de)
 Hourquet Roes (cabin)
 Les Ichantes
 Ichantes (forest)
 Illes (bank)
 Le Labay
 Lacazette
 Lacazotte
 Laresse
 Lartigalot
 Latoussé (Pènes des)
 Lespy
 Luc (barn)
 Manautton
 Mariebère (forest)
 Mirande
 Mousquaté (forest)
 Mousté (Col de)
 Pée Nouqué (ruins)
 Pouey
 La Poueye (Hosse de)
 Salaneuve (ruins)
 Les Salars
 Sarrelangue
 Sartiat (forest)
 Sézy (barn)
 Soumaous (Hosse de)
 Tousset
 l'Usclat (forest)

Neighbouring communes and villages

Toponymy
The commune name in Gascon is Aidius. Michel Grosclaude said that the name probably comes from the same root as Aydie but its origin and meaning remain obscure.

The following table details the origins of the commune name and other names in the commune.

Sources:

Grosclaude: Toponymic Dictionary of communes, Béarn, 2006 
Raymond: Topographic Dictionary of the Department of Basses-Pyrenees, 1863, on the page numbers indicated in the table. 
Cassini: Cassini Map from 1750

Origins:
Census: Census of Béarn

History
A rock shelter dating from prehistory called Abri Gandon-Lassus has been discovered in the commune.

Paul Raymond noted on page 18 of his 1863 dictionary that the commune had a Lay Abbey, vassal of the Viscounts of Béarn and that in 1385 there were 30 fires and Aydius depended on the bailiwick of Aspe.

Administration

List of Successive Mayors

Inter-communality
The commune is part of four inter-communal structures:
 the Communauté de communes du Haut Béarn;
 the Energy association of Pyrénées-Atlantiques;
 the inter-communal association for aid to education in the Vallée d'Aspe;
 the joint association for Haut-Béarn.

Demography
In 2017 the commune had 114 inhabitants.

Economy
The economy of the commune is mainly focused towards agriculture and livestock. The commune is part of the Appellation d'origine contrôlée (AOC) zone of Ossau-iraty.

Culture and heritage

Civil heritage
The commune has many sites that are registered as historical monuments:
The Maison Guiraudé (1891)
The Maison Pualet (16th century)
The Maison Hontas (18th century)
The Abri Gandon-Lassus Prehistoric Cave (Prehistory)
The Maison Ichante (1807)
The Maison Casaubon (18th century)

Religious heritage
The Parish Church of Saint Martin (14th century) is registered as an historical monument.

Environmental heritage
Aydie contains a number of high mountains:
The Sommet de Tachat (1,408 metres),
The Sommet de Talabot (1,591 metres),
The Sommet de Pétraube (1,606 metres,
The Sommet de Houndarete (1,695 metres),
The Soum de la Mousquère (1,778 metres,
The Turon de la Goaita (1,805 metres,
The Lousquette de Barca (1,870 metres,
The Pic de Lariou (1,903 metres, and
The Mailh Bassibe (1,973 metres.

See also
Communes of the Pyrénées-Atlantiques department

Bibliography
In his book L'ours et les brebis (The Bear and the sheep), Etienne Lamazou recounted his life as a transhumant shepherd from 1913 to 1969. Originally from Aydius, he never left except to take his cattle to their winter plain. He recounted the life of a shepherd as it still existed at the beginning of the 20th century. All the action takes place in and around Aydius and the book has many thousands of anecdotes sometimes soothing, sometimes moving, and often instructive.

References

External links

Aydius on the 1750 Cassini Map

Communes of Pyrénées-Atlantiques